Tyondai Adaien Braxton (born October 26, 1978) is an American composer and musician.  He has been composing and performing music under his own name and collaboratively under various group titles and collectives since the mid-1990s, including in the experimental rock group Battles from its formation in 2002 until his departure from the group in 2010. He studied composition at the Hartt School of the University of Hartford in West Hartford, Connecticut with Robert Carl, Ingram Marshall, and Ken Steen.

Career overview

In late 2002, Braxton co-founded Battles, in which, until 2010, he performed as guitarist, keyboardist and singer. The group received worldwide acclaim for their debut album Mirrored (2007), which, among other honors and awards, was hailed by Time and Pitchfork Media as one of the ten best records of the year. The 16-month tour for the record brought the band to such venues as The Cartier Foundation Museum in Paris, The Fuji Rock Festival in Northern Japan, and the Sydney Opera House in Australia for Brian Enoʼs Luminous Festival.

Braxton's Central Market was released worldwide by Warp Records in September 2009.  The album, Braxton's second full length as a solo artist, features a large-scale orchestral score with performances by The Wordless Music Orchestra. The album's name is both a nod at Stravinsky's Petrushka (the fairytale-like bazaar that opens that ballet), as well as the worldwide market crash of 2008.

Central Market was premiered by Braxton and The Wordless Music Orchestra in the U.S at Lincoln Center, followed by performances at the Library of Congress and The Walker Arts Museum. It premiered in the U.K at Steve Reich's Reverberation Festival, Barbican Centre, in 2011 with the BBC Symphony Orchestra performing and was adapted for ballet by Baryshnikov Art Center resident choreographer John Heginbotham.

In 2011, Braxton expanded his focus on an array of other commissions and performances, including a return to Alice Tully Hall to premiere of TREMS, a new 2 movement work for Bang on a Can All Stars, the Barbican premiere of Uffe’s Woodshop for string quartet performed by the Kronos Quartet, and a duo with seminal composer Philip Glass for the New York edition of the All Tomorrow’s Parties festival in 2012. Central Market was then performed by the London Sinfonietta and Wordless Music Group at Queen Elizabeth Hall at the Southbank Centre in London.

In 2013, Alarm Will Sound premiered Braxton’s piece for chamber orchestra and electronics, Fly by Wire, commissioned by and performed at Carnegie Hall. Central Market was performed by the Los Angeles Philharmonic at Disney Hall and the world premiere of HIVE the multimedia composition for 2 modular synthesizers players and 3 percussionists on 5 large wooden pods, premiered at the Solomon R. Guggenheim Museum in NYC and commissioned by Works & Process at The Guggenheim. HIVE was then premiered in Europe in Kraków, Poland at the Sacrum Profanum festival.

In early 2014, Braxton collaborated with the electronic music pioneers Mouse on Mars, performing a new version of In C by the American composer Terry Riley as a part of the Stargaze festival in Berlin, Germany at the Volksbühne. HIVE premiered in Australia at MONA FOMA in Hobart, Tasmania and at The Sydney Opera House in Sydney Australia, as a part of Sydney Festival.

In the summer of 2014, Drum Corps International's Bluecoats Drum and Bugle Corps included Braxton's compositions Uffe's Woodshop and Platinum Rows in their second place musical program, TILT.

In 2015, Braxton released HIVE1, his first solo album in six years and his first on Nonesuch Records. Written and recorded throughout 2013 and 2014, the recording comprises eight pieces that were originally conceived for a performance work called HIVE that debuted at New York’s Guggenheim Museum in 2013. Oranged Out E.P, comprising music from the HIVE1 recordings, followed in 2016.

In 2018 Braxton premiered Telekinesis a piece for electric guitars, orchestra, choir and electronics at Queen Elizabeth Hall at South Bank in London with the BBC Concert Orchestra and BBC Singers. It was performed in 2019 in Helsinki, Finland at the Helsinki Music Center with the Finnish Radio Symphony Orchestra.

In 2022, Braxton would release Multiplay, a three-song EP, followed by Telekinesis the studio recording of his piece for electric guitars, orchestra, choir and electronics on Nonesuch. As of fall 2022, Braxton joined the faculty of the music department at Princeton University.

Personal Life

His father is composer and saxophonist Anthony Braxton.

Recorded work

Death Slug 2000 (2000) – with Jonathan Matis
History That Has No Effect (2002), JMZ
Rise, Rise, Rise (2003), Narnack – split LP with Parts & Labor
Central Market (2009), Warp
Casino Trem (2015) featured on Bang on a Can Field Recordings Cantaloupe Music
HIVE1 (2015), Nonesuch
Oranged Out E.P (2016), Beatink Records
Music for Ensemble & Pitchshifter Delay (2017) featured on Yarn/Wire Currents 0 
ArpRec1(2017) featured on Brooklyn Rider Spontaneous Symbols In A Circle Records
Multiplay (2022), Nonesuch
Telekinesis (2022) Nonesuch
Vacancy (2022) featured on Stargaze One Transgressive Records
Sunny X (2023) Cedille Records

With Battles

EP C (Monitor Records; June 8, 2004)
B EP (Dim Mak Records; September 14, 2004)
EPC (Japan only special mix edition; Dotlinecircle; October 2004)
EP C/B EP (Warp Records; February 6, 2006)
Mirrored (Warp Records; May 14, 2007)
Lives (Limited edition CD; Beat Records; September 27, 2007)
Tonto+ (Warp Records; October 22, 2007)
Warp20 (Chosen) (Warp Records; September 29, 2009)
Twilight Saga: Eclipse OST (On "The Line"; Chop Shop Records; June 8, 2010)

Collaborations

Dirty Projectors (Domino Records; February 21, 2017)
Rubric Remix (appears on Rework Philip Glass Remixed; Orange Mountain Music; October 23, 2012)

References

External links

New Composers Davidson Review March 2011 New York Magazine on the "New New York School" of Composers

Temp Hides Fun, Fulfilling Life From Rest Of Office Satirical Onion piece, featuring Ty as an intern
2014 Bomb Magazine interview of Tyondai Braxton by Ben Vida

American male classical composers
American classical composers
Experimental composers
University of Hartford Hartt School alumni
American experimental guitarists
American male guitarists
Living people
1978 births
Warp (record label) artists
20th-century American guitarists
Battles (band) members
Dirty Projectors members
20th-century American composers
21st-century American guitarists
20th-century American male musicians
21st-century American male musicians